The Colonial Prisoners Removal Act 1884 is an act of the British Parliament whereby prisoners in British colonies may be transferred to the United Kingdom to serve their sentence. The legislation was used as recently as May 2020 when a man convicted of robbery in the Cayman Islands and in prison there, was transported to prison in the UK.

References

Law of the United Kingdom
1884 in the United Kingdom
Caymanian law
June 2017 events in the United Kingdom